The Wentworth Estate is a private estate of large houses set in about  woodland, in Runnymede, Surrey.  It was commenced in the early 1920s.  It lies within a gently undulating area of coniferous heathland and interlaces with the  Wentworth Golf Club, some properties only being accessed through the club grounds. It is colloquially known as 'The Island'.

Description
Most of its invariably large plots have homes built from scratch or rebuilt after 1930 in a range of styles from the ornate multi-chimneyed Arts and Crafts movement of the earliest properties through to the Neo-Georgian and colonial revival and the postmodern simple style as in the recording studios at John Lennon's Tittenhurst Park (1971) in the adjoining parish of Sunninghill and Ascot, the north of which, with parts of Windsor, Winkfield and Virginia Water, is the main piece of Crown Estate in South-East England, Windsor Great Park.

History

19th Century  
The 19th-century house the "Wentworths" (now the club house for the Wentworth Club) was the home of a brother-in-law of the 1st Duke of Wellington. It was purchased in 1850 by the exiled Carlist Ramón Cabrera, 1st Duke of Maestrazgo, and after his death, his wife bought up the surrounding lands which were later to form the nucleus of the Wentworth Estate.

20th Century 
In 1912, builder W.G. Tarrant had started developing St George's Hill, Weybridge – a development of houses based on minimal  plots based around a golf course. In 1922, Tarrant acquired the development rights for the Wentworth Estate, getting Harry Colt to develop a golf course around the "Wentworth" house. Tarrant developed the large houses on the estate to a similar Surrey formula used at St George's Hill – tall chimneys, dormer windows, gables, leaded lights, tile-hung or half-timbered or a combination of both; most using hand-made bricks and tiles. Some houses had stonework round the front door and stone fireplaces, a few had a marble floor in the hall, and the rarest – of which he was most proud – had a stone tablet with his initials WGT.

Development of Wentworth Estate ground to a halt due to depression in the late 1920s, and, in 1931, when the banks asked for repayment of a large debenture, Tarrant was forced to declare bankruptcy. The ownership of the land passed to Wentworth Estates Ltd, which came under the control of Sir Lindsay Parkinson & Co. Ltd. Construction picked up in the late 1930s, with many houses built by Tarrant Builders Ltd, with Tarrant's son Percy as one of the directors; but again stopped during World War II when the need arose to build high-density housing close to Virginia Water railway station.

Wentworth Subterranean Bunkers 
With the outbreak of World War II, Wentworth Estate was selected as an alternative seat of government and a rural command post, offering fewer security problems and more resources than the London Cabinet War Rooms (see also Cabinet War Rooms - Military Citadels under London. A subterranean bunker and tunnel system, now sealed and covered by car parks, was built near the Clubhouse. Designed by Harley Dalrymple-Hay, it was constructed in 1939 and consisted of two  diameter parallel tunnels made from cast iron London Underground tube segments with a  diameter service tunnel running between them. The bunkers were occupied by the GHQ Home Forces, and later the 1st Signal Regiment. The bunkers were vacated in December 1944.(See also)

Post-war 
Post-war development picked up considerably, and, by 1960, most of the available land was already used.

Planning and Amenities

In 1962, a committee of residents and the company promoted a private act of Parliament, and on 31 July 1964, the Wentworth Estate Act was given Royal Assent. The Act established the Wentworth Estate Roads Committee, which appoints its members on advice from the Wentworth Residents' Association.

The Wentworth Estate is laid out across 700 hectares (1750 acres) and forms one of Europe's premier residential areas. Within the estate borders are a mixture of public and private roads, footpaths and open areas.  It adjoins along a long border the long row of its village's shops, restaurants and other amenities, which is laid out upon similar lines, but has many 21st century converted mansions and newly built apartments.

The River Bourne runs through the area, which has a population of 5,895.

Transport
Road
Routes from the west of the estate lead into Berkshire and towards Camberley and the Bagshot junction of the M3, which links to Southampton and to the A303.

Rail
Wentworth is adjoined to its south and east by a major stop and minor stop railway station on the London Waterloo to Reading Line: Virginia Water and Longcross respectively.

Air

Residents

The estate was in the British newspaper headlines in 1998 when former Chilean dictator Augusto Pinochet was kept under house arrest in one of its houses prior to his extradition.

Peter Aven – Russian oligarch and banker, sanctioned during the 2022 Russian invasion of Ukraine, owner of Ingliston House  formerly Vijay Mallya's residence. 
Thomas Bjørn – golfer
Sultan of Brunei
Ron Dennis – British businessman
Ernie Els – South African golfer
Lady Wilnelia Forsyth-Johnson – former Puerto Rican Miss World and widow of Sir Bruce Forsyth
Prince Naseem Hamed – former Boxing world champion
Aidan Heavey – Irish businessman
Eddie Jordan – head of former Jordan F1 Team
Gary Numan – musician
Kevin Pietersen – Retired England International Cricketer

Former residents
Founder residents included Agatha Christie and her first husband, who was a friend of one of the estate's founders. The original residents built their own homes in any style they wished. She and her husband separated while living there and she sold the house, reportedly to repay the loan she had taken out to pay for it.

Russ Abbot – entertainer
Boris Berezovsky – oligarch
Diana Dors – actress
Bryan Forbes – actor and film director
Sir Bruce Forsyth – entertainer
Ted Heath – bandleader
Sir Elton John – musician
 Gulnara Karimova - Uzbek kleptocrat and daughter of Islam Karimov, former-president of Uzbekistan. Acquired hundreds of millions of dollars through bribery, convicted by Uzbek court.
Nanette Newman – actress
Augusto Pinochet, former Chilean dictator lived at Everglades
 Prajadhipok, abdicated king of Thailand
Sir Cliff Richard – singer
Sarah, Duchess of York
Andriy Shevchenko – striker for Chelsea F.C.
John Hay Whitney – US ambassador to the UK, publisher, art collector, philanthropist and investor
Betsey Cushing Roosevelt Whitney

References

External links

Wentworth Estate website

Virginia Water
Borough of Runnymede
Gated communities in the United Kingdom